The Joseph-Édouard-Perrault bridge, formerly known as the Pont Perrault-Charbonneau, is a covered bridge located at Warwick, Quebec, Canada. Built in 1908, it was used for automobile traffic until 1957. It was classified historical monument in 1999.

History 
Acquired by the Municipality of Warwick in 1998, the bridge was completely renovated in 2011. The bridge was re-opened on September 26, 2011. following an investment of $340,000.

Gallery

References

External links 
 

Bridges completed in 1908
Wooden bridges
Arthabaska Regional County Municipality